Janne Lundblad (11 April 1887 – 24 November 1940) was a Swedish Army officer and horse rider who competed in the 1920 Summer Olympics and in the 1928 Summer Olympics. In 1920 he and his horse Uno won the gold medal in the individual dressage.

Eight years later he won the silver medal with the Swedish dressage team. This time with his horse Blackmar. They also competed in the individual dressage event and finished fourth.

Lundblad was captain in the Swedish Army.

References

External links
profile

1887 births
1940 deaths
Swedish Army officers
Swedish dressage riders
Olympic equestrians of Sweden
Swedish male equestrians
Equestrians at the 1920 Summer Olympics
Equestrians at the 1928 Summer Olympics
Olympic gold medalists for Sweden
Olympic silver medalists for Sweden
Olympic medalists in equestrian
Medalists at the 1928 Summer Olympics
Medalists at the 1920 Summer Olympics